Owen DeVol Cox (March 20, 1910 – July 21, 1990) was a United States district judge of the United States District Court for the Southern District of Texas.

Education and career
Born in Joplin, Missouri, Cox received a Bachelor of Arts degree from the University of Kansas in 1931 and a Bachelor of Laws from the University of Kansas School of Law in 1932. He was in private practice in Corpus Christi, Texas from 1934 to 1942. He was an assistant city attorney of Corpus Christi in 1942, and an assistant state attorney general of Texas in the same year, becoming city attorney of Corpus Christi 1943 to 1944. He was in the United States Army during the later years of World War II, from March 1944 to November 1945 and became a staff sergeant. He was again city attorney of Corpus Christi from 1945 to 1946, thereafter returning to his private practice there until 1970.

Federal judicial service

On October 7, 1970, Cox was nominated by President Richard Nixon to a new seat on the United States District Court for the Southern District of Texas created by 84 Stat. 294. He was confirmed by the United States Senate on November 25, 1970, and received his commission on December 1, 1970. He assumed senior status on March 20, 1981. Cox served in that capacity until his death on July 21, 1990, in Corpus Christi.

References

Sources

External links

1910 births
1990 deaths
Judges of the United States District Court for the Southern District of Texas
United States district court judges appointed by Richard Nixon
20th-century American judges
United States Army non-commissioned officers